Friedrich Materna (21 June 1885 – 11 November 1946) was a general in the Bundesheer (Austrian Federal Army) in the 1930s and the German Wehrmacht during the World War II.

He became a general-major in the Austrian army in 1935, and he was also a part of the Bundesministerium für Landesverteidigung (Federal Ministry of Defence), in which he acted as Head of the Training Department.

After the Anschluss he was incorporated into the Wehrmacht, where from 1938 to 1940, he commanded the 45. Infanterie-Division. Between 1940 and 1942, he commanded the XX Armeekorps, and from 1942 to 1943, the Military District XVII.

Between 1943 and 1944, he was held in reserve, and, in 1944, he retired from the Army.

He died in 1946.

Awards
 Iron Cross (1939) 2nd and 1st Class
 German Cross in Gold (15 December 1942)
 Knight's Cross of the Iron Cross on 5 August 1940 as Generalleutnant and commander of the 45. Infanterie-Division

References

Further reading

External links
Friedrich Materna @ Lexikon der Wehrmacht

German Army generals of World War II
Generals of Infantry (Wehrmacht)
Moravian-German people
Recipients of the Gold German Cross
Recipients of the Knight's Cross of the Iron Cross
1885 births
1946 deaths
Austrian generals
People from Bruntál District
Austro-Hungarian military personnel of World War I
Austrian military personnel of World War II
Austro-Hungarian Army officers